Wilfredo Méndez (born 10 November 1996) is a Puerto Rican professional boxer who has held the WBO mini flyweight title between August 2019 to December 2021.

As of September 2021, he was ranked as the fourth best strawweight in the world by TBRB and The Ring.

Professional career

Early career
Méndez made his professional debut against Jean Carlos Molina on July 9, 2016. He won the fight by a second-right knockout. He won his next eight fights, amassing a professional record of 9-0 after his first two years as a professional.

Méndez was scheduled to fight Leyman Benavides on March 17, 2018, for the vacant WBA Fedelatin mini flyweight title. Benavides won the fight by unanimous decision. Méndez rebounded from this loss with a unanimous decision victory against Yenrry Bermudez.

Méndez was scheduled to fight Axel Aragon Vega on September 28, 2018, for the vacant WBO–NABO mini flyweight title. Following a sixth-round knockout of Armando Vazquez in a non-title bout on March 8, 2019, Méndez was scheduled to defend his WBO-NABO title against Janiel Rivera on May 24, 2019. He won the fight by split decision.

WBO mini flyweight champion

Méndez vs. Saludar
Méndez was scheduled to fight the reigning WBO mini-flyweight champion Vic Saludar on August 24, 2019. The fight was Saludar's second title defense and the first time that Méndez fought for a world title. Accordingly, Méndez came into the fight as the underdog to his more experienced opponent. Saludar's coach Jojo Palacios was unable to secure a working visa, while Saludar's manager Kenneth Rondal was also unable to go, as his father underwent brain surgery recently. As such, Saludar came into the fight without his usual corner. Throughout the bout, Méndez utilized outfighting tactics to keep distance from the pressuring Saludar, who scored the only knockdown of the fight in round 3. Despite being knocked down early in the fight, Méndez would nonetheless go on to win the fight by unanimous decision, with scores of 117–110, 115–112, 116–111.

Méndez vs. Vega
Méndez was scheduled to make his first title defense against Axel Aragon Vega on October 26, 2019. It was a rematch of their September 28, 2018 fight, which Méndez won by unanimous decision. Vega was at the time ranked #15 in WBO mini-flyweight rankings. Méndez utilized his significant reach and height advantage to keep control of the fight through the first three rounds, while Vega scored a knockdown in the fourth round. During the sixth round, Vega suffered a cut due to an accidental clash of heads. He was unable to continue at the start of the seventh round, which resulted in the bout going to a technical decision. Méndez won the fight by decision, with two of the judges scoring the fight 68-65 and 67–66 in his favor, while the third judge scored the fight 67-66 for Vega.

Méndez vs. Mendoza
For his second title defense, Méndez was scheduled to fight Gabriel Mendoza on February 8, 2020, who was at the time the #3 ranked fighter in The Ring 105 mini-flyweight rankings. Méndez dominated the fight, causing a cut above the right eye and a swelling on the forehead of Mendoza. He won the fight by a ninth-round technical knockout, as the referee judged Mendoza to have suffered too much damage throughout the bout. Méndez was scheduled to make his third title defense against Alexis Díaz on December 16, 2020. The bout was cancelled the day before the fight, after Méndez fell ill following the weigh-ins. Mendez was next scheduled to face Carlos Buitrago on August 14, 2021, at the Hotel El Panama in Panama City, Panama. Buitrago withdrew from the bout the day before the fight due to weight cut complications.

Méndez vs. Taniguchi
On October 7, 2021, the WBO ordered Méndez to make his third mini-flyweight title defense against the mandatory challenger Masataka Taniguchi. The pair was given a ten-day negotiation period to come to terms regarding the fight. As they were unable to come to terms, the fight was sent to a purse bid, with a minimum bid of $80,000. As no bids were placed, a second purse bid with a minimum of $40,000 was set for October 27. The WBO announced on October 27, 2021, that a successful purse bid was held. Méndez would face Taniguchi on December 14, 2021, on the undercard of the Naoya Inoue and Aran Dipaen bantamweight title bout. The bout took would take place at the Ryōgoku Kokugikan in Tokyo, Japan. Méndez lost the fight by an eleventh-round technical knockout. He suffered an early setback after being knocked down in the second round, and appeared to fall behind on the scorecards in the remaining rounds. After attempting to rally back in the tenth round, and briefly stunning Taniguchi, Méndez was finally stopped by a flurry of punches in the next round.

Continued mini-flyweight career
Méndez was booked to face Kenny Cano in an eight-round mini-flyweight bout on April 8, 2022, at the Pabellon de Esgrima in Santo Domingo, Dominican Republic. Prior to this fight, Méndez switched camps and began training with the former three-time WBO junior lightweight world champion Román Martínez. He won the fight by a shutout unanimous decision, with all three judges scoring the bout 60–53 in his favor.

Méndez was expected to face Israel Vázquez on August 20, 2022, in the main event of "Sixt Boxing Nights". The bout was cancelled on August 14, after Méndez injured his knee in training. Méndez was instead booked to face Moises Caro Gutierrez on November 4, 2022. He won the fight by unanimous decision, with two scorecards of 97–91 and one scorecard of 99–89.

Méndez was expected to face the unbeaten Oscar Collazo in a WBO mini-flyweight title eliminator on January 28, 2023. The fight was scheduled for the undercard of the Alexis Rocha and Anthony Young welterweight bout, which took place at the YouTube Theater in Inglewood, California. Méndez withdrew from the fight on January 15, after suffering a back injury in training.

Professional boxing record

See also
List of mini-flyweight boxing champions
List of Puerto Rican boxing world champions

References

External links

1996 births
Living people
People from Caguas, Puerto Rico
Puerto Rican male boxers
Mini-flyweight boxers
World mini-flyweight boxing champions
World Boxing Organization champions
Southpaw boxers